The 1999 Wimbledon Championships was a tennis tournament played on grass courts at the All England Lawn Tennis and Croquet Club in Wimbledon, London in the United Kingdom. It was the 113th edition of the Wimbledon Championships and were held from 21 June to 4 July 1999.

Prize money
The total prize money for 1999 championships was £7,595,330. The winner of the men's title earned £455,000 while the women's singles champion earned £409,500.

* per team

Champions

Seniors

Men's singles

 Pete Sampras defeated  Andre Agassi, 6–3, 6–4, 7–5
 It was Sampras' 12th career Grand Slam singles title and his 6th at Wimbledon.

Women's singles

 Lindsay Davenport defeated  Steffi Graf, 6–4, 7–5
 It was Davenport's 2nd career Grand Slam singles title and her 1st and only at Wimbledon.

Men's doubles

 Mahesh Bhupathi /  Leander Paes defeated  Paul Haarhuis /  Jared Palmer, 6–7(10–12), 6–3, 6–4, 7–6(7–4)
 It was Bhupathi's 2nd career Grand Slam doubles title and his 1st at Wimbledon. It was Paes' 2nd career Grand Slam doubles title and his 1st at Wimbledon.

Women's doubles

 Lindsay Davenport /  Corina Morariu defeated  Mariaan de Swardt /  Elena Tatarkova, 6–4, 6–4
 It was Davenport's 3rd and last career Grand Slam doubles title and her 1st at Wimbledon. It was Morariu's 1st and only career Grand Slam doubles title.

Mixed doubles

 Lisa Raymond /  Leander Paes defeated  Jonas Björkman /  Anna Kournikova, 6–4, 3–6, 6–3
 It was Paes' 1st career Grand Slam mixed doubles title. It was Raymond's 2nd career Grand Slam mixed doubles title and her 1st at Wimbledon.

Juniors

Boys' singles

 Jürgen Melzer defeated  Kristian Pless, 7–6(9–7), 6–3

Girls' singles

 Iroda Tulyaganova defeated  Lina Krasnoroutskaya, 7–6(7–3), 6–4

Boys' doubles

 Guillermo Coria /  David Nalbandian defeated  Todor Enev /  Jarkko Nieminen, 7–5, 6–4

Girls' doubles

 Dája Bedáňová /  María Emilia Salerni defeated  Tatiana Perebiynis /  Iroda Tulyaganova, 6–1, 2–6, 6–2

Singles seeds

Men's singles
  Pete Sampras (champion)
  Pat Rafter (semifinals, lost to Andre Agassi)
  Yevgeny Kafelnikov (third round, lost to Cédric Pioline)
  Andre Agassi (final, lost to Pete Sampras)
  Richard Krajicek (third round, lost to Lorenzo Manta)
  Tim Henman (semifinals, lost to Pete Sampras)
  Mark Philippoussis (quarterfinals, lost to Pete Sampras)
  Todd Martin (quarterfinals, lost to Pat Rafter)
  Greg Rusedski (fourth round, lost to Mark Philippoussis)
  Goran Ivanišević (fourth round, lost to Todd Martin)
  Gustavo Kuerten (quarterfinals, lost to Andre Agassi)
  Carlos Moyá (second round, lost to Jim Courier)
  Karol Kučera (fourth round, lost to Cédric Pioline)
  Tommy Haas (third round, lost to Wayne Arthurs)
  Nicolas Kiefer (second round, lost to Boris Becker)
  Félix Mantilla (second round, lost to Paul Goldstein)

Women's singles
  Martina Hingis (first round, lost to Jelena Dokic)
  Steffi Graf (final, lost to Lindsay Davenport)
  Lindsay Davenport (champion)
  Monica Seles (third round, lost to Mirjana Lučić)
  Jana Novotná (quarterfinals, lost to Lindsay Davenport)
  Venus Williams (quarterfinals, lost to Steffi Graf)
  Arantxa Sánchez Vicario (second round, lost to Lisa Raymond)
  Nathalie Tauziat (quarterfinals, lost to Mirjana Lučić)
  Mary Pierce (fourth round, lost to Jelena Dokic)
  Serena Williams (withdrew before the tournament began)
  Julie Halard-Decugis (third round, lost to Alexandra Stevenson)
  Amanda Coetzer (third round, lost to Kim Clijsters)
  Sandrine Testud (third round, lost to Tamarine Tanasugarn)
  Barbara Schett (fourth round, lost to Lindsay Davenport)
  Dominique Van Roost (fourth round, lost to Nathalie Tauziat)
  Natasha Zvereva (second round, lost to Tatiana Panova)
  Anna Kournikova (fourth round, lost to Venus Williams)

References

External links
 Official Wimbledon Championships website

 
Wimbledon Championships
Wimbledon Championships
Wimbledon Championships
Wimbledon Championships